Saint Sithney (Latin: Sidinius; ; date unknown) was a sub-Roman Celtic saint active in Cornwall and Brittany. He is the patron saint of mad dogs.

A Breton folk story, an adaptation of a tale associated with Ciarán of Saigir, states that God asked Sithney to be the patron saint of girls seeking husbands, but Sithney said he would rather be the patron saint of mad dogs and get some rest.

He is the patron saint of Sithney, Cornwall, United Kingdom, and is invoked for help against rabies and mad dogs, and for healing of mad dogs.  He was also venerated at Guissény, Brittany, and at a number of other places in Brittany. The legends of St Sezni were compiled by Albert Le Grand in 1636 and a Breton translation of this was published in 1848 as Buez Sant Sezny. William Worcester recorded in 1478 that the body of the saint lay within the church of Sithney.

References

External links 

Saint Sithney at Saints.SQPN.com

Medieval Breton saints
Medieval Cornish saints
Burials in Cornwall